WSTC (1400 kHz) is a public AM radio station in Stamford, Connecticut.  It serves the Stamford-Norwalk area with a non-commercial, listener-supported news/talk radio format, simulcast with co-owned WSHU 1260 AM Westport, Connecticut. WSTC is owned by Sacred Heart University.

Programming on WSTC and WSHU includes NPR shows Morning Edition, All Things Considered, Fresh Air with Terry Gross and 1A.  A local staff supplies Connecticut news updates.

History
The call sign was WSRR. From the 1950s through the 80s, it was a full service, middle of the road station, featuring popular adult music with local news and sports. In 1947, it added an FM station, WSTC-FM (now WARW.

WSTC was sold by Cox Radio, Inc. in 2011 and was initially operated by Sacred Heart via a local marketing agreement (LMA).  Prior to 2011, WSTC and WNLK 1350 AM in Norwalk, Connecticut simulcast a commercial news/talk format.

On January 25, 2016, WSTC dropped its public radio simulcast with WSHU 1260 AM and went silent.  It returned to the air on June 1, 2016, with a format of adult standards with some talk shows.  That format lasted only a little more than a year.

On July 10, 2017, WSTC returned to a simulcast of NPR news/talk-formatted WSHU 1260 AM Westport.

References

External links

 

Mass media in Stamford, Connecticut
Radio stations established in 1941
1941 establishments in Connecticut
STC